David Ellison (born January 9, 1983) is an American film producer and actor best known as the founder and CEO of Skydance Media.

Early life and education
David Ellison was born in Santa Clara County, California. He is the son of billionaire Oracle Corporation co-founder and chairman Larry Ellison, and his ex-wife, Barbara Boothe Ellison. His father is of Italian and Jewish heritage. David attended the University of Southern California. He has one sister, film producer Megan Ellison, who founded Annapurna Pictures.

Career
Ellison is the CEO and founder of Skydance Media. In 2010, with his father then the sixth richest person in the world, and a partnership deal with Paramount, Skydance was able to raise $350 million in equity and credit to co-finance and co-produce movies. The company's films include Mission: Impossible – Fallout, Annihilation, World War Z, True Grit, Jack Reacher, Star Trek Into Darkness, Star Trek Beyond and many more. With the 2010 transaction, Ellison was named to Varietys Dealmaker list for 2010 and the Forbes 30 Under 30 list in 2011.

As an actor, Ellison has performed in the films Flyboys, Little Fish, Strange Pond and Hole in One.

Ellison's company Skydance Media expanded in 2013 with the launch of its television division. He has executive produced shows such as Altered Carbon, and Grace and Frankie.

In 2014, Ellison launched a new line of men's clothing, called the "LANAI Collection."

In 2017, Ellison helped launch Skydance Animation in partnership with Spain's Ilion Animation Studios.

In 2018, he announced that Skydance Media had partnered with Tencent Holdings Limited.

Personal life
Ellison is a licensed pilot with instrument ratings for helicopter aviation, aerobatics, commercial aviation, fixed-wing aircraft, and multi-engine aircraft. In 2003, aged 20, he was selected to perform as part of Sean D. Tucker's "Stars of Tomorrow" aerobatic team at EAA AirVenture Oshkosh.

Ellison is a member of the Producers Guild of America and Television Academy.

He married Sandra Lynn Modic, an actress and singer, on October 1, 2011 in Palm Springs, California.

Filmography

Film

Actor

Director

Writer

Thanks

Television

Executive producer
 Manhattan (2014−15)
 Ten Days in the Valley (2017)
 Grace and Frankie (2015−18)
 Dietland (2018)
 Condor (2018–present)
 Altered Carbon (2018−19)
 Jack Ryan (2018−present)
 Foundation (2021–present)
 Reacher (2022–present)
 Good Rivals (2022)
 The Checkup with Dr. David Agus (2022)
 The Big Door Prize (2023)
 FUBAR (2023)
 Ring Shout (TBA)
 Cross (TBA)
 Hotel del Luna (TBA)

Actor

References

External links
 
 David Ellison Work Summary

1983 births
Living people
American male film actors
American film producers
American aviators
American people of Italian descent
American people of Russian-Jewish descent
Film producers from California
People from Santa Clara County, California
University of Southern California people
Schools of the Sacred Heart alumni
Commercial aviators
Skydance Media people